Oskolkov (from oskolok meaning a splinter) is a Russian masculine surname, its feminine counterpart is Oskolkova. It may refer to:
Albert Oskolkov (born 1973), Russian football player
Ilya Oskolkov-Tsentsiper (born 1967), Russian social designer, media manager and entrepreneur

References

Russian-language surnames